Rodalben is a Verbandsgemeinde ("collective municipality") in the Südwestpfalz district, in Rhineland-Palatinate, Germany. The seat of the municipality is in Rodalben.

The Verbandsgemeinde Rodalben consists of the following Ortsgemeinden ("local municipalities"):

 Clausen 
 Donsieders 
 Leimen 
 Merzalben 
 Münchweiler an der Rodalb 
 Rodalben

Verbandsgemeinde in Rhineland-Palatinate
Palatinate Forest